Jaime Luciano Balmes y Urpiá (August 28, 1810July 9, 1848) was a Spanish philosopher, theologian, Catholic apologist, sociologist and political writer. Familiar with the doctrine of Saint Thomas Aquinas, Balmes was an original philosopher who did not belong to any particular school or stream, and was called by Pius XII the Prince of Modern Apologetics.

Biography 
Balmes was born at Vic, in the region of Catalonia in Spain and baptized the same day in the cathedral of that city with the name of Jaime Luciano Antonio. He died in the same city.

In 1817, Balmes began his studies at the seminary in Vic: three years of Latin grammar, three of Rhetoric and, from 1822, three of Philosophy. In 1825, in Solsona, he received the tonsure from the Bishop of this city, Manuel Benito Tabernero.

From 1825 to 1826, Balmes studied courses of Theology, also in Vic Seminary. He studied four courses of Theology, thanks to a scholarship, in the College of San Carlos at the University of Cervera.

For two years in 1830, because of the closure of the University of Cervera, Balmes continued studying in Vic, on his own. On June 8, 1833 he received his degree in theology.

On September 20, 1834, in the chapel of the episcopal palace of Vic, Balmes was ordained a priest by bishop don Pablo de Jesús Corcuera. He continued his studies in theology and of Canons, again at the University of Cervera. Finally, in 1835, he received the title of Doctor of Theology and Bachelor of Canons.

Balmes then made several attempts to teach in an official way at the University of Barcelona and not get engaged for some time in Vic tutoring. Finally, the City Council appoints him, in 1837, Professor of Mathematics, a position that he held for four years. In 1839, his mother Teresa Urpiá, died. In 1841, he moved to Barcelona.

Then, Balmes began his creative activity and contributed to various newspapers and magazines: Peace, Catholic Madrid, Civilization; and several pamphlets that attract readers' attention.

From 1841, his creative genius "exploded" and he developed in a few highly active months his writings and his personality, that would be admired throughout Europe.

On September 7, 1844, he wrote and published "The true idea of value, or thoughts on the origin, the nature and variations of the prices" in which he solved the value paradox, clearly introducing the notion of marginal use, Balmes asked himself, "Why a precious stone has a higher value than a piece of bread?"

Having attacked the regent Espartero, he was exiled. On his return, he founded and edited El Pensamiento de la Nación, a Catholic and conservative weekly; however, his fame rests principally on El Protestantismo comparado con el Catolicismo en sus relaciones con la Civilización Europea (Protestantism and Catholicity compared in their Effects on the Civilization of Europe), an able defence of Catholicism on the ground that it represents the spirit of obedience or order, as opposed to Protestantism, the spirit of revolt or anarchy. The book is often cited as a counter argument to historical accounts that focus on the reputed central role of the Protestant thought to the development of modern society.

According to the Encyclopædia Britannica Eleventh Edition:
The best of his philosophical works, which are clear expositions of the scholastic system of thought, are the Filosofia Fundamental (Basic Philosophy), and the Curso de Filosofia Elemental (A Course of Elementary Philosophy), which he translated into Latin for use in seminaries.

Balmes argued in favor of monarchy.

He died from tuberculosis in Vic in 1848.

 Thought 

Generally the philosophy of Balmes is understood merely as "philosophy of common sense", when in reality it is something much more complex. Both in  Fundamental Philosophy  and in  Elementary Philosophy  (being this second work more informative) is the subject of certainty.

Balmes divides the truth into three irreducible classes, although we speak of it as if it were only one. These are the subjective truths, the rational truths and the objective truths. The first type of truth, the subjective one, can be understood as a present reality for the subject, which is real but depends on the perception of the speaker. For example, affirming that one is cold or that one is thirsty are subjective truths. The second type, the rational one, is logical and mathematical truth, using any operation of this type as an example. Finally, the objective truth is understood as that which, although perceived by all, does not fall within the category of rational truth: to affirm that the sky is blue, or that there are trees in the forest.

The three types of truth are irreducible, and the methods of recruitment differ from one to the other. Therefore, it is necessary that the philosophy first of all consider what kind of truth we are looking for.

For Balmes there is no possibility of doubting everything: making such statement, we forget that there are a series of rules of thought that we admit as truths in order to be able to doubt. In a similar way to that posed by St Augustine or Descartes, to affirm that we doubt necessarily implies the certainty that we are doubting. In this way, doubt is also a certainty. An authentic radical skeptic is impossible, because there is no universal doubt.

Certainty is natural and intuitive like doubt, and prior to philosophy. Thus, the common and natural certainty also encompasses the Cartesian philosophical certainty. To reach this certainty, the so-called "criteria" are necessary, the means by which we can access the truth. There are a lot of criteria for having, also, several types of truths. However, Balmes prefers to distribute them in three: the criteria of conscience, those of evidence and those of common sense. These are the criteria for accessing the three types of truth. To define the corpus of Balmes's thought as "philosophy of common sense" is not so much due to his conception of common sense as inherent in philosophical work, but especially because of his definition of this sense as a criterion for reaching a certainty. At this point, it is worth noting the relationship of subjective truths with criteria of conscience, rational truths with those of evidence and finally, objective truths accessible through the criterion of so-called "common sense".

Therefore, Balmes argues that metaphysics should not be sustained only on one column, but on three that correspond to the three truths: thus, the principle of Cartesian consciousness, the  cogito ergo sum  is a truth subjective, while the principle of non-contradiction Aristotelian is truly rational. Finally, common sense, the intellectual instinct (perhaps it is "intellectual instinct" a more specific term than "common sense") presents the so-called objective truth. It is impossible to find a truth common to the three principles.

In this way, Balmes denies the exclusivity of the theories of philosophers: philosophy is the fullness of natural knowledge, and is rooted in being a man. To affirm, for example, that the "cogito" is the foundation of truth and philosophy is not in itself a wrong assertion, because it is true what it affirms, but false what it denies, because besides the "cogito" There are other possibilities of foundation. Balmes does not reduce this idea only to the field of philosophy, and extends it also to general human thought.

In this way, the fundamental thesis of Balmes is that there is no formula from which the universe can be detached. There is no truth from which all others arise. At this point, the three criteria can be defined more thoroughly.

 Consciousness 
Consciousness is what you notice on the inside, what you think and experience. Sensations would be useless if they were not experienced in consciousness. This criterion has several characteristics: the first is the subjective nature of consciousness, that is, our perception is that of the phenomenon, not that of reality, although for Balmes, subjectivity does not imply that the certainty achieved is not true. It also has the function of pointing or presenting. Consciousness does not put us in contact with external reality, nor with others (we can not perceive – yes suppose – the existence of consciousness in others), but it presents facts, it is an absolute that dispenses with relationships. Consciousness has no objectivity or light, it is pure presence.

When the language expresses the conscience, it betrays it, because something personal can not be expressed through something universal. Language is incapable of expressing pure consciousness, something that art can do, for example. Likewise, consciousness can not be wrong either, because we are not mistaken about the experience of it, although it can be fallible when it leaves its ground to go outside. There is no error in the internal phenomenon, but perhaps in its correspondence with the outside. Balmes, against the Cartesian animaina machina, defends that the animals also have conscience, but in his case it is reduced to the sensation, and not to the intellectualization of it. Thus, they possess only a direct consciousness, while humans -for our intellective capacity- also possess reflex consciousness, which is the capacity to reflect on the sensations of direct consciousness.

For Balmes, consciousness is the foundation of the other criteria, and all are necessarily born of it.

 Evidence 
Unlike consciousness, the evidence is not singular and contingent. The evidence has universality and a logical necessity. Balmes divides between two types of evidence, the immediate and the mediate: the first does not require proof, it is a priori knowledge, such as knowing that every object is equal to itself. On the other hand, mediate evidence requires demonstration.

The evidence does not capture a fact, but captures its relationships. It is captured that the idea of the predicate is in the subject (similar to the analytical judgment of Kant). All evidence is based on the principle of non-contradiction, and is reduced to the analytical. Forget the synthetic judgments that are not exclusively rational, do not consider that the criterion of evidence is accompanied by the senses. Therefore, for Balmes, the analysis of consciousness is better than the analysis of evidence.

 Intellectual instinct 
The intellectual instinct gives us the correspondence between the idea and reality, it is not an animal instinct, but a rational instinct. Through this instinct we know that what we see exists, or at least that there is a representation of what we see. These kinds of truths are by definition broader than the intellectual truths of the evidence. The same truth can also be had by means of an intellectual rather than an instinct: to give an example, it can be known whether a business works or not through an economic study or through an intuition of common sense. Thus, in the common sense, there is the unconscious -like the moral truths, or the sensations- or that which through the intellectual instinct we see as evident, for example, the scientific truths. It is also through this instinct that we know demonstrable truths without having to prove them, or we consider truth as probability, that is, the awareness of contingency: to give an example, to be aware of the possibilities we have to win the lottery, or to achieve write something coherent by moving the pen randomly on the paper.

For Balmes, these are the three pillars of metaphysics. To better define this, there is an analysis of the  cogito ergo sum  Cartesian, according to which the affirmation of the "I think, therefore I exist" Cartesian is in principle a truth of conscience, later transformed into an intellectual truth of evidence, a logical syllogism whose reality is understood through intuition. Having founded the  cogito  on something intellectual, Descartes falls into the risk of reducing the  cogito  to something logical and intellectual. For this reason, for Balmes, consciousness is the fundamental pillar of metaphysics, but for him transcends the "cogito" the clear and distinct Cartesian idea: consciousness is the pillar because it is where experience is lived and given sense.

 Works 
 La Religión Demostrada al Alcance de los Niños, La Sociedad de Operarios, 1847.
 Consideraciones Políticas sobre la Situación de España, Imprensa de José Tauló, 1840.
 Observaciones Sociales, Políticas y Económicas sobre los Bienes del Clero, Reimpreso en la Oficina de M. Brambila, 1842.
 La Civilización, Tom. II, Tom. III, Brusi, 1841–1842.
 El Protestantismo Comparado con el Catolicismo en sus Relaciones con la Civilización Europea, Tom. II, Tom. III, Tom. IV, José Tauló, 1842–1845.
 El Criterio, A. Brusi, 1845. 
 El Pensamiento de la Nación; Periódico Religioso, Político y Literario, Tom. II, Tom. III, Imprensa de E. Aguado, 1844–46.
 Cartas a un Escéptico en Materia de Religión, Impr. de A. Brusi, 1846. 
 Pio IX, Impr. y fundicion de D. E. Aguado, 1847.
 Escritos Politicos, Sociedad de Operarios del Mismo Arte, 1847.
 Curso de Filosofía Elemental, Tom. II, Impr. y Fund. de E. Aguado, 1847.
 Escritos Póstumos del Dr. D. Jaime Balmes, Imp. de A. Brusi, 1850.
 Filosofía Fundamental, Tom. II, Garnier, 1852. 
 Poesías Póstumas, Imprensa del Diario de Barcelona, 1870.
 Obras Completas del Dr. D. Jaime Balmes, Pbro. Primera Edición Crítica Ordenada y Anotada por el P. Ignacio Casanovas, S.J. Biblioteca Balmes, 33 Vol., 1925.
 "Verdadera idea del valor, o reflexiones sobre el origen, naturaleza y variedades de los precios", in Obra Completas, vol. 5, Madrid, BAC, 1949

Works in English translation
 European Civilization: Protestantism and Catholicity Compared in their Effects on the Civilization of Europe, Murphy & Co., 1850.
 [https://archive.org/stream/protestantismcat00balmrich#page/n3/mode/2up Protestantism and Catholicity Compared in their Effects on the Civilization of Europe,']' J. Murphy, G. Quigley, 1851.
 Fundamental Philosophy, Vol. II, D. & J. Sadlier & Co., 1858.
 Fundamental Philosophy, Vol. II, D. & J. Sadlier & Co., 1871–1880.
 Letters to a Sceptic on Religious Matters, William B. Kelly, 1875.
 Elements of Logic, P. O'Shea, 1876.
 In Menczer, Béla, 1962. Catholic Political Thought, 1789–1848, University of Notre Dame Press.
 "Faith and Liberty," pp. 185–191.

See also 
 Carrer de Balmes

Notes

References 
 A. de Blanche-Raffin, Jacques Balmes, sa vie et ses ouvrages, 1849.
 Vida y Juicio Crítico de los Escritos de D. Jaime Bálmes, Impr. de D. Anselmo Santa Coloma, 1850.
 E. Bullon Fernandez, Jaime Balmis y sus Oberas, Madrid, 1903.

Further reading 
 Córdoba, Buenaventura de. Noticia Histórico-Literaria del Dr. D. Jaime Balmes, Presbitero, Eusebio Aguado, 1848.
 Clark, Kelly James. "Spanish Common Sense Philosophy: Jaime Balmes' Critique of Cartesian Foundationalism," History of Philosophy Quarterly, Vol. 7, No. 2, Apr. 1990.
 Davis, Harold Eugene. "Jaime Balmes, Spanish Traditionalist: His Influence in Spanish America," The Americas, Vol. 35, No. 3, Jan. 1979.
 Huerta de Soto, Jesus, "Juan de Mariana et la Seconde Scolastique espagnole", in Philippe Nemo & Jean Petitot, Histoire du liberalism en Europe, Puf, Paris, 2006
 Marshall, Odum Walter. Jaime Balmes and the Politics of Reconciliation in Spain, 1843–1848, Ph.D. Dissertation, Florida State University, 1978.
 Roca Blanco, Dionisio. Balmes (1810–1848), Ediciones del Orto, 1997.
 Sadurni, Albert. Balmes, Imp. y Llibreria de L. Anglada, 1910.
 Sainz de Robles, Federico Carlos. Balmes, Compañía Bibliográfica Española, 1964.
 Santos, Benito Garcia de los. Vida de Balmes, Sociedad de Operarias del Mismo Arte, 1848.

External links 

 
 
 Catholic Encyclopedia article
 Jaume Balmes at Gran Enciclopèdia Catalana 

1810 births
1848 deaths
Spanish philosophers
Spanish political writers
Spanish monarchists
Philosophers from Catalonia
People from Vic
Catholic philosophers
Members of the Royal Spanish Academy